Cruikshank is a surname of Scottish origin, and is a spelling variation of Cruickshank. Notable people with the surname include:

Brad Cruikshank (born 1979), Canadian ice hockey winger
Chester Cruikshank (1913–1970), American athlete
Dan Cruikshank (born 1949) architectural historian and broadcaster
Dane Cruikshank (born 1995), American football player
George Cruikshank (1792–1878), English caricaturist 
Holly Cruikshank (born 1973), American dancer
Isaac Cruikshank (1756–1811), Scottish painter and caricaturist
Isaac Robert Cruikshank (1789–1856),  caricaturist, illustrator, and portrait miniaturist
Lucas Cruikshank (born 1993), web producer and creator of Fred, a web-based show on YouTube
Marcus Henderson Cruikshank (1826–1881), Confederate States of America politician
Margaret Cruikshank (born 1940), American feminist writer and scholar
Margaret Mordecai Jones Cruikshank (1878–1955), American academic administrator and teacher
Robert Edward Cruickshank (1888–1961), Anglo-Canadian soldier, recipient of the Victoria Cross
Sally Cruikshank (born 1949), American cartoonist and animator
Thomas H. Cruikshank, former chairman and CEO of Halliburton Energy Services
 William Cruikshank (disambiguation), several people

See also
3531 Cruikshank, main-belt asteroid 
United States v. Cruikshank, 1876 United States Supreme Court Decision
Cruickshank (disambiguation)

Scottish surnames